is a retired male long-distance runner from Japan who mainly competed in the marathon race during his career. He set his personal best (2:07:59) in the classic distance on March 4, 2001, in Otsu.

Achievements
All results regarding marathon, unless stated otherwise

External links

1971 births
Living people
Japanese male long-distance runners
Japanese male marathon runners
21st-century Japanese people